Catriona Forrest (born 27 February 1984, in Glasgow) is a female field hockey defender from Scotland. She plays club hockey for Glasgow Western Ladies, and made her debut for the Women's National Team in 2005. Her older brother James represented Scotland at cricket up to U19 level. She is a physiotherapist for the British National Health Service.

See also
 Catriona

References

 sportscotland

1984 births
Living people
Scottish female field hockey players
Field hockey players at the 2006 Commonwealth Games
Field hockey players from Glasgow
Commonwealth Games competitors for Scotland